Batá-rumba is a hybrid form of Cuban rumba combining batá drums with guaguancó. It was created by the group Afro-Cuba De Matanzas.

Rumba
Cuban styles of music